Ridgewood is a rural locality in the Shire of Noosa, Queensland, Australia.

Geography

History
Mary River Road Provisional School opened in 1916. Circa 1918 it was renamed Ridgewood State School. It closed circa 1961.

In the  Ridgewood had a population of 612 people.

Between 2008 and 2013 the locality was within Sunshine Coast Region due to an unpopular local government amalgamation that was subsequently reversed.

References

Further reading 

  – includes Ridgewood State School.

Suburbs of Noosa Shire, Queensland
Localities in Queensland